Disanthus cercidifolius is a species of flowering plant in the family Hamamelidaceae. It is native to woodland habitats in China and Japan.

Nomenclature
The term Disanthus refers to the flowers that come in axillary pairs. The Latin specific epithet cercidifolius means "with leaves like the redbud tree (Cercis)". The epithet was originally spelled D. cercidifolia. The International Code of Nomenclature for algae, fungi, and plants stipulates that the Latin grammatical gender is masculine, and so the spelling is D. cercidifolius.

Description
It is noted for its heart-shaped leaves which turn to shades of red, purple and yellow in autumn.

Varieties
Disanthus cercidifolius var. longipes — endemic to China.

Cultivation
Disanthus cercidifolius is cultivated as an ornamental plant. It is a calcifuge, requiring a lime-free soil.

The plant has gained the Royal Horticultural Society's Award of Garden Merit.

'Ena Nishiki' is a variegated cultivar with white and green foliage while 'Golden Crown' is a white and yellow variegated cultivar.

References

Hamamelidaceae
Flora of China
Flora of Japan
Garden plants of Asia